Georgios Litskas (born 16 June 1995) is a Greek professional footballer who plays as a striker for Apollon Paralimnio. His hometown is Alexandroupoli where he was born on june 16, 1995.

Honours
Kavala
Gamma Ethniki: 2018–19

References

1995 births
Living people
Greek footballers
Super League Greece players
Football League (Greece) players
Super League Greece 2 players
Gamma Ethniki players
Panthrakikos F.C. players
Kavala F.C. players
Doxa Drama F.C. players
A.E. Karaiskakis F.C. players
Apollon Paralimnio F.C. players
Association football forwards
Footballers from Alexandroupolis